Prairie City is a village in McDonough County, Illinois, United States. The population was 407 at the 2020 census.

Geography
Prairie City is located in the northeast corner of McDonough County at  (40.620740, -90.463582). It is bordered to the north by Warren County. Illinois Route 41 passes through the village as East Main Street, leading northeast  to St. Augustine and southwest  to Bushnell.

The village drains northeast toward Gallett Creek, a north-flowing tributary of Cedar Creek, part of the Spoon River watershed leading to the Illinois River.

The Decker Press
From 1937 to 1950, Prairie City was home to the Decker Press, which in the mid-1940s was the largest publishing house in America devoted exclusively to putting out poetry. The business was not financially successful, and its founder, Prairie City native James A. Decker, sold it to a local lumber dealer, Harry M. Denman, who in turn sold it several months later to Ervin Tax, a poet from Chicago. Decker left town, but his sister, Dorothy, remained.

Tax tried to make the business more efficient and profitable—buying new presses and binding equipment and hiring an artist, sales promoter and other employees. But the Decker Press came to a tragic end in May 1950 when Dorothy, who had fallen in love with Tax in a one-side relationship, shot Tax in the head with a rifle and then killed herself.

Demographics

Per the 2010 US Census, Prairie City had 379 people.  Among non-Hispanics this includes 371 White (97.9%), 5 Black (1.3%), 1 Asian (0.3%), & 1 from two or more races.  The Hispanic or Latino population included 1 person (0.3%).

Of the 135 households 43 had children under the age of 18 living with them, 80 were married couples living together, 5 (3.7%) had a female householder with children & no husband present, and 34 were non-families. 25 households were one person and 37 had someone who was 65 or older. The average household size was 2.62 and the average family size was 2.92.

The age distribution was 78.1% over the age of 18 and 19.3% 65 or older. The median age was 43.5 years. The gender ratio was 50.1% male & 49.9% female.  Among 135 occupied households, 121 were owner-occupied & 14 were renter-occupied.

At the 2000 census there were 461 people, 155 households, and 119 families in the town. The racial makeup of the town was 97.61% White, 1.08% Asian, and 1.30% from two or more races. Hispanic or Latino of any race were 0.87%.

Of the 155 households 40.0% had children under the age of 18 living with them, 60.0% were married couples living together, 9.7% had a female householder with no husband present, and 22.6% were non-families. 19.4% of households were one person and 11.0% were one person aged 65 or older. The average household size was 2.76 and the average family size was 3.13.

The age distribution was 28.6% under the age of 18, 7.8% from 18 to 24, 25.4% from 25 to 44, 18.9% from 45 to 64, and 19.3% 65 or older. The median age was 36 years. For every 100 females, there were 92.1 males. For every 100 females age 18 and over, there were 81.8 males.

The median household income was $36,875, and the median family income  was $40,313. Males had a median income of $27,143 versus $21,389 for females. The per capita income for the town was $12,269. About 21.2% of families and 22.6% of the population were below the poverty line, including 31.5% of those under age 18 and 8.0% of those age 65 or over.

References

Villages in McDonough County, Illinois
Villages in Illinois